Reyna Hamui (born December 28, 1993, in Mexico City) is a Mexican figure skater. She is the 2012 Mexican national champion.

When Hamui was ten years old, she and her family moved from Mexico to Florida, where they lived for six years before moving to Delaware for better training conditions. In August 2012, she moved to Detroit where she is coached by Jason Dungjen and Yuka Sato.

Programs

Competitive highlights

References

External links 

 
 Reyna Hamui at sport-folio.net
 Reyna Hamui at Tracings

1993 births
Mexican female single skaters
Living people
Sportspeople from Mexico City
Competitors at the 2015 Winter Universiade